Julius Lekakeny Sunkuli is a Kenyan politician. He previously represented the Kilgoris Constituency in the National Assembly of Kenya in between 1997 and 2002. He also served as Minister in the Kenyan Government and was recently Kenya's envoy to China, prior to resigning to the Narok County senator's seat in the 2013 general election

In August 2022, the former internal security minister Julius Sunkuli has made a comeback to elective politics as Kilgoris MP-elect after 20 years outside Parliament.

Rape Allegations
In 1999, two schoolgirls claimed they had been raped by Mr Sunkuli, who was then a cabinet minister in the government of Daniel Arap Moi . Sunkuli is alleged to have offered money for an abortion, but the girl, a fourteen-year-old named Florence, decided to keep her baby. A catholic priest John Anthony Kaiser put the girls in touch with the Kenyan Federation of Women Lawyers, FIDA-Kenya. The attorneys submitted the evidence to the government, but Sunkuli was never charged. Instead, police stormed the building where the girls were hiding.

References

Living people
Year of birth missing (living people)
Members of the National Assembly (Kenya)
Ambassadors of Kenya to China